Ralph D'Agostino ("Ralphie Dee") is an American D.J. known for a career spanning disco, electronic and rave music. He was resident D.J. at 2001 Odyssey Disco in Brooklyn, New York at the time when "Saturday Night Fever" was filmed there. The movie was largely responsible for the popularization of disco lifestyle, and attracted numerous tourists to 2001 Odyssey starting in 1978 and through the 1980s. Many disco music hits were first heard there from the hands of DJ's such as Chuck Rusinak and D'Agostino. Many live recordings were done at 2001 and are available online (See also the External Links section).

Starting in 1978, Ralphie Dee was hired by WKTU to perform for lunch mixes and their nightly Saturday shows.

In the late 1980s he started a production career which began in the mid 1990s, and continues today, which resulted in a discography of more than 250 releases at a time when the rave scene began to take shape in the United Kingdom. The phase was marked by collaborations with Tommy Musto and Lenny Dee.  With the latter he created pieces such as "Out Takes" (1989), "Overdose (The Final Trip)" and "Manslaughter" (the last two from the 1990 EP "Major Problems") under New York label Nu Groove. "Out Takes" caught the ear of promoters upon hitting the United Kingdom, which resulted in a tour over Europe in the year 1990. On his return to the United States, "Major Problems - Ovderdose" had entered the Record Mirror charts. Other prominent records include 3 ep’s under the name "English Muffin” with Lenny Dee and “Chantal – The Realm” with Anthony Mannino and Dennis Pino as the acapella on the record is one of the most sampled in techno history.

In 2007, Ralphie Dee was inducted into The Legends of Vinyl Hall of Fame. The year 2017 was the 40th anniversary of Saturday Night Fever’s release as there were many concerts featuring the original artists who appeared on the album along with Ralphie appearing as the DJ. Since March 2020, during the Covid-19 pandemic he’s been seen doing live video Dj sets in over 10 countries. He also appeared in 2021 True House Stories series with Lenny Fontana.

1980s venues 

With the legacy of his time at 2001 Ralphie began playing at various clubs that had opened in Brooklyn, Queens, Long Island and Staten Island and Manhattan.
 1981 Blossoms - Staten Island 
 1981 Haddar II - Staten Island
 1982 Scarletts - Staten Island
 1983 The Rooftop - Manhattan
 1984 City Scene - Brooklyn
 1984 City Scene On The Lake - Long Island
 1984 Promotions - Brooklyn
 1984 Club B - Brooklyn
 1986 231 -Long Island
 1986 Avanti - Queens
 1986 Speaks - Long Island
 1986 Metro 700 - Long Island
 1987 21 Hudson - Manhattan
 1987 Fokos -Long Island
 1987 Pastels - Brooklyn
 1989 Illusions - Brooklyn
 1988 The Funhouse - Manhattan
 1989 Palladium - Manhattan
 1989 Tunnel  - Manhattan
 1989 Roxy - Manhattan

1990s selected world venues 

 Q Bar - Bangkok, Thailand
 Clorophilla – Taranta, Italy
 Shadowlands (3 times) – various, Holland
 Cave Club – Salzburg, Austria
 Digital Overdose – Amsterdam, Holland
 Narcissus – Bangkok, Thailand
 Ultraschall – Munich, Germany
 Club UK / Final Frontier – London, England
 Rezerection (twice) – Edinburgh, Scotland
 Tresor – Berlin, Germany
 Energy 94’ – Zurich, Switzerland
 Mazzo – Amsterdam, Holland
 Eurobeat 2000 (3times) – London, England
 Hellraiser (4 times) – Amsterdam, Holland
 Warehouse (Koln) – Koln, German
 Grand Slam – Berlin, Germany
 Cherrymoon – Gent, Belgium
 Planet E – Basel, Switzerland
 Rex Club (3 times) – Paris, France
 Palladium – New York City, New York
 Limelight – New York City,  New York
 Cocorico – Riccione, Italy
 Danceteria – New York City, New York
 G Power 1 and 2 – Pavia, Italy

Notable Releases 
 C'hantal - The Realm
 English Muffin
 Major Problems - Overdose
 Primitive Passions (with Mustafa Alici)
 Cologne Summer (EP)
 Blip Trip (EP)
 New York Grooves (several volumes)

References

External links 
Ralphie Dee at Discogs
Ralphie Dee at Disco-Disco 
Ralphie Dee at Mixcloud 
Ralphie Dee at Facebook
Ralphie Dee at SoundCloud

Living people
American DJs
Disco musicians
Electronic musicians
Year of birth missing (living people)